This is a list of people affiliated with the Panjab University. The list excludes people whose only connection with Panjab University is that they were awarded an honorary degree.

Faculty

Alumni

Arts and literature

Business

Humanities and social sciences

Military

Politics and law

Heads of state and government

Other politicians, civil servants, and lawyers

Science and technology

Sports

Others

References

Notes

Citations 

Panjab University